The Tungusic languages  (also known as Manchu-Tungus and Tungus) form a language family spoken in Eastern Siberia and Manchuria by Tungusic peoples. Many Tungusic languages are endangered. There are approximately 75,000 native speakers of the dozen living languages of the Tungusic language family. Some linguists consider Tungusic to be part of the controversial Altaic language family, along with Turkic, Mongolic, and sometimes Koreanic and Japonic.

The term "Tungusic" is from an exonym for the Evenk people (Ewenki) used by the Yakuts ("tongus"). It was borrowed into Russian as "тунгус", and ultimately transliterated into English as "Tungus".

Classification
Linguists working on Tungusic have proposed a number of different classifications based on different criteria, including morphological, lexical, and phonological characteristics. Some scholars have criticized the tree-based model of Tungusic classification and argue that the long history of contact among the Tungusic languages makes them better treated as a dialect continuum.

The main classification is into a northern branch and a southern branch (Georg 2004) although the two branches have no clear division, and the classification of intermediate groups is debatable.

Four mid-level subgroups are recognized by Hölzl (2018), namely Ewenic, Udegheic, Nanaic, and Jurchenic.

Alexander Vovin notes that Manchu and Jurchen are aberrant languages within South Tungusic but nevertheless still belong in it, and that this aberrancy is perhaps due to influences from the Para-Mongolic Khitan language, from Old Korean, and perhaps also from Chukotko-Kamchatkan and unknown languages of uncertain linguistic affiliation.

Southern Tungusic (Jurchenic-Nanaic)
  (Southwestern Tungusic) ("Manchu group")
 Jurchen (extinct, developed into Manchu in the 17th century)
 Manchu: speakers originated from the Sungari Ula River area (they founded the Jin and Qing or Manchu dynasties of China)
 Xibe: spoken in Qapqal Xibe Autonomous County, Xinjiang. (Developed separately since 1764 from a Qing military garrison)
 Chinese Kyakala (恰喀拉)
 Bala (巴拉)
  (阿勒楚喀)
 Nanaic (Southeastern Tungusic) ("Nanai group" / "Amur group")
 Nanai (Gold, Goldi, Hezhen) (Akani, Birar, Samagir)
 Upper Amur 
 Right-bank Amur 
 Sungari 
 Bikin (Ussuri) 
 Central Amur
 Sakachi-Alyan 
 Naykhin (basis of standard Nanai but not identical)
 Dzhuen
 Lower Amur 
 Bolon
 Ekon
 Gorin
 Orok (Uilta)
 Northern (East Sakhalin) 
 Southern (South Sakhalin, Poronaysky)
 Ulch / Olcha

Transitional Southern-Northern Tungus (Udegheic)
 Udegheic (Oroch–Udege; strongly influenced by Southern Tungusic)
 Oroch †? 
Tumninsky dialect †?
Khadinsky dialect †?
Hungarisky dialect †?
 Udege / Udihe

Northern Tungusic
 Ewenic
 Even (Lamut) (in eastern Siberia)
 Arman
 Indigirka 
 Kamchatka 
 Kolyma-Omolon 
 Okhotsk
 Ola
 Tompon
 Upper Kolyma
 Sakkyryr
 Lamunkhin
 Evenki
 Evenki (obsolete: Tungus), spoken by Evenks in central Siberia and Manchuria
 Solon (Solon Ewenki)
 Hihue/Hoy (basis of the standard, but not identical) 
 Haila’er 
 Aoluguya (Olguya) 
 Chenba’erhu (Old Bargu) 
 Morigele (Mergel) 
 Siberian Ewenki / Ewenki of Siberia
 Northern (spirant) 
 Ilimpeya (subdialects: Ilimpeya, Agata and Bol'shoi, Porog, Tura, Tutonchany, Dudinka/Khantai)
 Yerbogachen (subdialects: Yerbogachen, Nakanno)
 Southern (sibilant) 
 Hushing 
 Sym (subdialects: Tokma/Upper Nepa, Upper Lena/Kachug, Angara)
 Northern Baikal (subdialects: Northern Baikal, Upper Lena)
 Hissing 
 Stony Tunguska (subdialects: Vanavara, Kuyumba, Poligus, Surinda, Taimura/Chirinda, Uchami, Chemdal'sk)
 Nepa (subdialects: Nepa, Kirensk)
 Vitim-Nercha/Baunt-Talocha (subdialects: Baunt, Talocha, Tungukochan, Nercha)
 Eastern (sibilant-spirant) 
 Vitim-Olyokma (subdialects: Barguzin, Vitim/Kalar, Olyokma, Tungir, Tokko)
 Upper Aldan (subdialects: Aldan, Upper Amur, Amga, Dzheltulak, Timpton, Tommot, Khingan, Chul'man, Chul'man-Gilyui)
 Uchur-Zeya (subdialects: Uchur, Zeya)
 Selemdzha-Bureya-Urmi (subdialects: Selemdzha, Bureya, Urmi)
 Ayan-Mai (subdialects: Ayan, Aim, Mai, Nel'kan, Totti)
 Tugur-Chumikan (subdialects: Tugur, Chumikan)
 Sakhalin (no subdialects)
 Negidal
 Lower Negidal †
 Upper Negidal 
 Oroqen
 Gankui (basis of standard Oroqen but not identical)
 Selpechen
 Kumarchen
 Selpechen
 Orochen
 Kili (previously thought to be a dialect of Nanai)

Zimin (2020)
Zimin (2020) proposes a Tungus–Manchu family with two primary branches, namely the Jurchenic and Tungusic (proper) branches.

Tungus–Manchu
Jurchenic
Xi Yeren Jurchen
Bala
Alchuka
Jurchen proper
Haixi Jurchen
spoken Sibo
Guanwai
Ilanbou
Tailai
Aigun
Niŋgutan, Girinese
Jianzhou Jurchen
Hebei, Mukdenese Manchu
written Manchu; Sibo
Tungusic (proper)
Nanic
Uilta
Nanai
Nani
Lower Amur Nanai
Ussuri–Bikin Nanai
Middle Amur Nanai
Oroch–Ewonic
Ewonic
Southern
Northern
Eastern
Oroch–Udyhe
Oroch
Kur–Urmi Udyhe
Siȟotə–Aliň Udyhe

History

Proto-Tungusic
Some linguists estimate the divergence of the Tungusic languages from a common ancestor spoken somewhere in Eastern Manchuria around 500 BC to 500 AD. (Janhunen 2012, Pevnov 2012) Other theories favor a homeland closer to Lake Baikal. (Menges 1968, Khelimskii 1985) While the general form of the protolanguage is clear from the similarities in the daughter languages, there is no consensus on detailed reconstructions. As of 2012, scholars are still trying to establish a shared vocabulary to do such a reconstruction. The Lake Khanka region was found to present the most likely homeland, based on linguistic and ancient genetic data.

There are some proposed sound correspondences for Tungusic languages. For example, Norman (1977) supports a Proto-Tungusic *t > Manchu s when followed by *j in the same stem, with any exceptions arising from loanwords. Some linguists believe there are connections between the vowel harmony of Proto-Tungusic and some of the neighboring non-Tungusic languages. For example, there are proposals for an areal or genetic correspondence between the vowel harmonies of Proto-Korean, Proto-Mongolian, and Proto-Tungusic based on an original RTR harmony. This is one of several competing proposals, and on the other hand, some reconstruct Proto-Tungusic without RTR harmony.

Some sources describe the Donghu people of 7th century BC to 2nd century BC Manchuria as Proto-Tungusic. Other sources sharply criticize this as a random similarity in pronunciation with "Tungus" that has no real basis in fact.

The historical records of the Korean kingdoms of Baekje and Silla note battles with the Mohe in Manchuria during the 1st and 2nd centuries. Some scholars suggest these Mohe are closely connected to the later Jurchens, but this is controversial.

Alexander Vovin (2015) notes that Northern Tungusic languages have Eskimo–Aleut loanwords that are not found in Southern Tungusic, implying that Eskimo–Aleut was once much more widely spoken in eastern Siberia. Vovin (2015) estimates that the Eskimo–Aleut loanwords in Northern Tungusic had been borrowed no more than 2,000 years ago, which was when Tungusic was spreading northwards from its homeland in the middle reaches of the Amur River.

Wang and Robbeets (2020) place the Proto-Tungusic homeland in the Lake Khanka region.

Liu et al. (2020)  revealed that Haplogroup C-F5484 and its subclades are the genetic markers of Tungusic-speaking peoples. C-F5484 was emerged 3,300 years ago and begun to diverge 1,900 years ago, indicating the approximate age of differentiation of Tungusic languages.

Jurchen-Manchu language
The earliest written attestation of the language family is in the Jurchen language, which was spoken by the rulers of the Jin dynasty (1115–1234). The Jurchens invented a Jurchen script to write their language based on the Khitan scripts. During this time, several stelae were put up in Manchuria and Korea. One of these, among the most important extant texts in Jurchen, is the inscription on the back of "the Jin Victory Memorial Stele" (Da Jin deshengtuo songbei), which was erected in 1185, during the Dading period (1161–1189). It is apparently an abbreviated translation of the Chinese text on the front of the stele. The last known example of the Jurchen script was written in 1526.

The Tungusic languages appear in the historical record again after the unification of the Jurchen tribes under Nurhaci, who ruled 1616-1626. He commissioned a new Manchu alphabet based on the Mongolian alphabet, and his successors went on to found the Qing dynasty. In 1636, Emperor Hong Taiji decreed that the ethnonym "Manchu" would replace "Jurchen". Modern scholarship usually treats Jurchen and Manchu as different stages of the same language.

Currently, Manchu proper is a dying language spoken by a dozen or so elderly people in Qiqihar, China. However, the closely related Xibe language spoken in Xinjiang, which historically was treated as a divergent dialect of Jurchen-Manchu, maintains the literary tradition of the script, and has around 30,000 speakers. As the only language in the Tungusic family with a long written tradition, Jurchen-Manchu is a very important language for the reconstruction of Proto-Tungusic.

Other Tungusic languages
Other Tungusic languages have relatively short or no written traditions. Since around the 20th century, some of these other languages can be written in a Russian-based Cyrillic script, but the languages remain primarily spoken languages only.

Research
The earliest Western accounts of Tungusic languages came from the Dutch traveler Nicolaes Witsen, who published in the Dutch language a book, Noord en Oost Tartarye (literally 'North and East Tartary'). It described a variety of peoples in the Russian Far East and included some brief word lists for many languages. After his travel to Russia, his collected findings were published in three editions, 1692, 1705, and 1785. The book includes some words and sentences from the Evenki language, then called "Tungus".

The German linguist Wilhelm Grube (1855–1908) published an early dictionary of the Nanai language (Gold language) in 1900, as well as deciphering the Jurchen language for modern audiences using a Chinese source.

Common characteristics
The Tungusic languages are of an agglutinative morphological type, and some of them have complex case systems and elaborate patterns of tense and aspect marking.

The normal word order for all of the languages is subject–object–verb.

Phonology
Tungusic languages exhibit a complex pattern of vowel harmony, based on two parameters: vowel roundedness and vowel tenseness (in Evenki, the contrast is back and front, rather). Tense and lax vowels do not occur in the same word; all vowels in a word, including suffixes, are either one or the other. Rounded vowels in the root of a word cause all the following vowels in the word to become rounded, but not those before the rounded vowel. Those rules are not absolute, and there are many individual exceptions.

Vowel length is phonemic, with many words distinguished based on the distinction between short vowel and long vowel.

Tungusic words have simple word codas, and usually have simple word onsets, with consonant clusters forbidden at the end of words and rare at the beginning.

Below are Proto-Tungusic consonants as reconstructed by Tsintsius (1949) and the vowels according to Benzing (1955):

{| class="wikitable" style=text-align:center
|+ Consonants
! colspan=2 |
! scope="col" | Labial
! scope="col" | Dental
! scope="col" | Palatal
! scope="col" | Velar
|-
! scope="row" rowspan=2 | Stop
! voiceless
| p || t ||  || k
|-
! voiced
| b || d ||  || g
|-
! scope="row" rowspan=2 | Affricate
! voiceless
|  ||  || č || 
|-
! voiced
|  ||  || ǯ || 
|-
! colspan=2 | Fricative
|  || s || š || x
|-
! colspan=2 | Nasal
| m || n || ń || ŋ
|-
! colspan=2 | Lateral approximant
|  || l ||  || 
|-
! colspan=2 | Rhotic
|  || r ||  || 
|-
! colspan=2 | Glide
| w ||  || j || 
|}

{| class="wikitable" style=text-align:center
|+Vowels
!  !! front !! central !! back
|-
! high
| i, ü ||  || ï, u
|-
! mid
| e || ö || o
|-
! low
|  || a || 
|}

Lexicon
Below are the reconstructed Proto-Tungusic forms for the lexical items in the Leipzig–Jakarta list, extracted from the Etymological Dictionary of the Altaic Languages (2003).

Relationships with other languages
Tungusic is today considered a primary language family. Especially in the past, some linguists have linked Tungusic with Turkic and Mongolic languages in the Altaic language family. However, a genetic, as opposed to an areal, link remains unproven. Others have suggested that the Tungusic languages may be related (perhaps as a paraphyletic outgroup) to the Koreanic, Japonic, or Ainu languages as well (see Macro-Tungusic).

In 2017, a link to Turkic and Mongolic languages was again proposed by Martine Robbeets in her "Transeurasian family" (another name for Macro-Altaic). According to Robbeets, Tungusic is closest to Mongolic languages. The evidence for this proposal has been criticized by Tian. et al.

Despite some similarities between the Tungusic and Koreanic languages, Alexander Vovin (2013) considers Tungusic and Koreanic to be separate, unrelated language groups that share areal rather than genetic commonalities through mutual influence of Goguryeo and Jurchen on each other.

The language of the Avars in Europe which created the Avar Khaganate is believed by some scholars to be of Tungusic origin.

See also
 Lists of endangered languages
 Language death

References

Citations

Sources 

 Kane, Daniel. The Sino-Jurchen Vocabulary of the Bureau of Interpreters. Indiana University Uralic and Altaic Series, Volume 153. Bloomington, Indiana: Indiana University Research Institute for Inner Asian Studies, 1989. .
 Miller, Roy Andrew. Japanese and the Other Altaic Languages. Chicago, IL: The University of Chicago Press, 1971.
 Poppe, Nicholas. Vergleichende Grammatik der Altaischen Sprachen [A Comparative Grammar of the Altaic Languages]. Wiesbaden: Otto Harrassowitz, 1960.
 Tsintsius, Vera I. Sravnitel'naya Fonetika Tunguso-Man'chzhurskikh Yazïkov [Comparative Phonetics of the Manchu-Tungus Languages]. Leningrad, 1949.
 Stefan Georg. "Unreclassifying Tungusic", in: Carsten Naeher (ed.): Proceedings of the First International Conference on Manchu-Tungus Studies (Bonn, August 28 – September 1, 2000), Volume 2: Trends in Tungusic and Siberian Linguistics, Wiesbaden: Harrassowitz, 45–57.

 Hölzl, Andreas & Payne, Thomas E. (eds.). 2022. Tungusic languages: Past and present. (Studies in Diversity Linguistics 32). Berlin: Language Science Press. DOI: 10.5281/zenodo.7025328  https://langsci-press.org/catalog/book/355 Open Access.

Further reading 
Aixinjueluo Yingsheng. 2014. Manyu kouyu yindian . Peking: Huayi chubanshe.
.
Alonso de la Fuente, José Andrés. 2015. Tungusic historical linguistics and the Buyla (a.k.a. Nagyszentmiklós) inscription. Studia Etymologica Cracoviensia 20. 17-46.
Alonso de la Fuente, José Andrés. 2017a. An Oroch word-list lost and rediscovered: A critical edition of Tronson's 1859 pseudo- Nivkh vocabulary. Bulletin of the School of Oriental and African Studies 80(1). 97-117.
Alonso de la Fuente, José Andrés. 2017b. From converb to classifier? On the etymology of Literary Manchu nofi. In Michał Né meth, Barbara Podolak & Mateusz Urban (eds.), Essays in the history of languages and linguistics. Dedicated to Marek Stachowski on the occasion of his 60th birthday, 57-80. Cracow: Księgarnia Akademicka.
Alonso de la Fuente, José Andrés. 2018. Past tenses, diminutives and expressive palatalization: Typology and the limits of internal reconstruction in Tungusic. In Bela Kempf, Ákos Bertalan Apatóczky & Christopher P. Atwood (eds.), Philology of the Grasslands: Essays in Mongolic, Turkic, and Tungusic Studies, 112-137. Leiden: Brill.
Aralova, Natalia. 2015. Vowel harmony in two Even dialects: Production and perception. Utrecht: LOT.
Baek, Sangyub. 2014. Verbal suffix -du in Udihe. Altai Hakpo 24. 1-22.
Baek, Sangyub. 2016. Tungusic from the perspective of areal linguistics: Focusing on the Bikin dialect of Udihe. Sapporo:Graduate School of Letters, Hokkaidō University. (Doctoral dissertation.)
Baek, Sangyub. 2017. Grammatical peculiarities of Oroqen Evenki from the perspective of genetic and areal linguistics. Linguistic Typology of the North, vol. 4. 13-32.
Baek, Sangyub . 2018. Chiiki gengo-gaku-teki kanten kara mita tsungūsu shogo no hojo dōshi  . Hoppō gengo kenkyū  8. 59-79.
Bogunov, Y. V., O. V. Maltseva, A. A. Bogunova & E. V. Balanovskaya 2015. The Nanai clan Samar: The structure of gene pool based on Y-chromosome markers. Archaeology, Ethnology and Anthropology of Eurasia 43(2). 146-152.
Bulatova, Nadezhda. 2014. Phonetic correspondences in the languages of the Ewenki of Russia and China. Altai Hakpo 24. 23-38.
Chaoke  D. O. 2014a. Man tonggusiyuzu yuyan cihui bijiao . Peking: Zhongguo shehui kexue chubanshe.
Chaoke  D. O. 2014a. Man tonggusiyuzu yuyan ciyuan yanjiu . Peking: Zhongguo shehui kexue chubanshe.
Chaoke  D. O. 2014c. Xiboyu 366 ju huihuaju. Peking: Shehui kexue wenxian chubanshe.
Chaoke  D. O. 2014d. Manyu 366 ju huihuaju. Peking: Shehui kexue wenxian chubanshe.
Chaoke  D. O. 2016a. Ewenke yu jiaocheng . Peking: Shehui kexue wenxian chubanshe.
Chaoke  D. O. 2016b. Suolun ewenke yu jiben cihui . Peking: Shehui kexue wenxian chubanshe.
Chaoke  D. O. 2017. Ewenke zu san da fangyan cihui bijiao . Peking: Shehui kexue wenxian chubanshe.
Chaoke  D. O. & Kajia  2016a. Suolun ewenke yu huihua . Peking: Shehui kexue wenxian chubanshe.
Chaoke  D. O. & Kajia  2016b. Tonggusi ewenke yu huihua . Peking: Shehui kexue wenxian chubanshe.
Chaoke  D. O. & Kajia . 2017. Nehe ewenke yu jiben cihui . Peking: Shehui kexue wenxian chubanshe.
Chaoke  D. O. & Kalina . 2016. Ewenkezu yanyu . Peking: Shehui kexue wenxian chubanshe.
Chaoke  D. O. & Kalina . 2017. Arong ewenke yu . Peking: Shehui kexue wenxian chubanshe.
Chaoke  D. O. & Sirenbatu . 2016. Aoluguya ewenke yu huihua . Peking: Shehui kexue wenxian chubanshe.
Chaoke  D. O. & Wang Lizhen . 2016. Ewenkezu minge geci . Peking: Shehui kexue wenxian chubanshe.
Chao Youfeng  & Meng Shuxian . 2014. Zhongguo elunchunyu fangyan yanjiu . Guoli minzuxue bowuguan diaocha baogao  116. 1-113.
Corff, Oliver et al. 2013. Auf kaiserlichen Befehl erstelltes Wörterbuch des Manjurischen in fünf Sprachen: „Fünfsprachenspiegel“. Wiesbaden: Harrassowitz.
Crossley, Pamela K. 2015. Questions about ni- and nikan. Central Asiatic Journal 58(1-2). 49-57.
Do, Jeong-up. 2015. A comparative study of Manchu sentences in Manwen Laodang and Manzhou Shilu. Altai Hakpo 25. 1-35.
Doerfer, Gerhard & Michael Knüppel. 2013. Armanisches Wörterbuch. Nordhausen: Verlag Traugott Bautz.
Dong Xingye . 2016. Hezheyu . Harbin: Heilongjiang renmin chubanshe.
Duggan, Ana T. 2013. Investigating the prehistory of Tungusic peoples of Siberia and the Amur-Ussuri region with complete mtDNA genome sequences and Y-chromosomal markers. PlosOne 8(12). e83570.
Duo Limei  & Chaoke  D. O. 2016. Tonggusi ewenke yu yanjiu . Peking: Shehui kexue wenxian chubanshe.
Grenoble, Lenore A. 2013. The syntax and pragmatics of Tungusic revisited. In Balthasar Bickel, Lenore A. Grenoble, David A. Peterson and Alan Timberlake (eds.), Language typology and historical contingency. In honor of Johanna Nichols, 357-382. Amsterdam: Benjamins.
Grenoble, Lenore A. 2014. Spatial semantics, case and relator nouns in Evenki. In Pirkko Suihkonen & Lindsay J. Whaley (eds.), On diversity and complexity of languages spoken in Europe and North and Central Asia,111-131. Amsterdam: Benjamins.
Gusev, Valentin. 2016. Figura etymologica in Uilta. Hoppō jinbun kenkyū  9. 59-74.
Hasibate’er . 2016. Aoluguya fangyan yanjiu . Peking: Minzu chubanshe.
Hölzl, Andreas. 2017a. Kilen: Synchronic and diachronic profile of a mixed language. Paper presented at the 24th LIPP Symposium, June 21–23, 2017, Munich.
Hölzl, Andreas. 2017b. New evidence on Para-Mongolic numerals. Journal de la Société Finno-Ougrienne 96. 97-113.
Hölzl, Andreas. 2018a. Constructionalization areas: The case of negation in Manchu. In Evie Coussé, Peter Andersson & Joel Olofsson (eds.), Grammaticalization meets construction grammar (Constructional Approaches to Language 21), 241-276. Amsterdam: Benjamins.
Hölzl, Andreas. 2018b. Udi, Udihe, and the language(s) of the Kyakala. IJDL - International Journal of Diachronic Linguistics and Linguistic Reconstruction 15. 111-146.
Hölzl, Andreas. 2018c. Das Mandschurische: Ein diachroner Überblick. Asien-Orient Institut, Universität Zürich, 16.03.2018.
Hölzl, Andreas. 2018d. A typology of questions in Northeast Asia and beyond: An ecological perspective. (Studies in Diversity Linguistics 20). Berlin: Language Science Press.
Hölzl, Andreas & Yadi Hölzl. 2019. A wedding song of the Kyakala in China: Language and ritual. IJDL - International Journal of Diachronic Linguistics & Linguistic Reconstruction 16. 87–144.
Huang Xihui . 2016. Manwen zhuanzi chuangzhi shijian ji fenqi yanjiu . Altai Hakpo 26. 63- 84.
Jang Taeho & Tom Payne. 2018. The modern spoken Xibe verb system. IJDL - International Journal of Diachronic Linguistics and Linguistic Reconstruction 15. 147-169.
Jang, Taeho, Kyungsook Lim Jang & Thomas E. Payne. forthcoming A typological grammar of Xibe.
Janhunen, Juha. 2005. Tungusic. An endangered language family in Northeast Asia. International Journal of the Sociology of Language 173. 37–54.
Janhunen, Juha. 2015. Recent advances in Tungusic lexicography. Studia Orientalia Electronica 3. 17-20.
Janhunen, Juha 2016. Reconstructio externa linguae ghiliacorum. Studia Orientalia 117. 3-27.
Kane, Daniel. 2013. Introduction, Part 2: An update on deciphering the Kitan language and scripts. Journal of Song-Yuan Studies 43. 11-25.
Kang, Hijo, Jiwon Yun & Seongyeon Ko. 2017. Vowels of Beryozovka Ewen: An acoustic phonetic study. Altai Hakpo 27. 1-23.
Kazama Shinjirō , . 2015a. Dagūru-go no goi ni okeru tsungūsu shogo to no kyōtsū yōso ni tsuite  . Hoppō jinbun kenkyū  8. 1-23.
Kazama Shinjirō , . 2015b. Euen-go buisutoraya hōgen no gaisetsu to tekisuto  . Hoppō gengo kenkyū  5. 83-128.
Khabtagaeva, Bayarma. 2017. The Ewenki dialects of Buryatia and their relationship to Khamnigan Mongol. Wiesbaden: Harrassowitz.
Khabtagaeva, Bayarma. 2018. The role of Ewenki VgV in Mongolic Reconstructions. In Bela Kempf, Ákos Bertalan Apatóczky & Christopher P. Atwood (eds.), Philology of the Grasslands: Essays in Mongolic, Turkic, and Tungusic Studies, 174-193. Leiden: Brill.
Kim, Alexander. 2013. Osteological studies of archaeological materials from Jurchen sites in Russia. Journal of Song-Yuan Studies 43. 335- 347.
Ko, Seongyeon, Andrew Joseph & John Whitman. 2014. In Martine Robbeets and Walter Bisang (eds.), Paradigm change: In the Transeurasian languages and beyond, 141-176. Amsterdam: Benjamins.
Kuzmin, Yaroslav V. et al. 2012. The earliest surviving textiles in East Asia from Chertovy Vorota Cave, Primorye Province, Russian Far East 86(332). 325-337.
Li Linjing . 2016. Hojengo no kaiwa tekisuto (6) (6). Hoppō gengo kenkyū   6. 131-152.
Liu Xiaodong  & Hao Qingyun . 2017. Bohaiguo lishi wenhua yanjiu . Harbin: Heilongjiang renmin chubanshe.
Liu Yang . 2018. Jin shangjingcheng yizhi faxian wenzi zhuan chuyi . Beifang wenwu  1. 60-61.
Miyake, Marc. 2017a. Jurchen language. In Rint Sybesma (ed.), Encyclopedia of Chinese language and linguistics, 5 vols., 478-480. Leiden: Brill.
Miyake, Marc 2017b. Khitan language. In Rint Sybesma (ed.), Encyclopedia of Chinese language and linguistics, 5 vols., 492‒495. Leiden: Brill.
Mu Yejun . 1985. Alechuka manyu yuyin jianlun . Manyu yanjiu 1. 5-15.
Mu, Yejun . 1986: Alechuka manyu de shuci yu gezhuci . Manyu yanjiu  2. 2‒17.
Mu, Yejun . 1987: Balayu . Manyu yanjiu  2. 2‒31, 128.
Moritae Satoe , . 2016. Uiruta-go kita hōgen tekisuto: `Fuyu, chichi ga watashi o tsuremodoshita‘  : . Hoppō jinbun kenkyū  9. 143-163.
Najia . 2017. Dula‘er ewenke yu yanjiu . Peking: Shehui kexue wenxian chubanshe.
Norman, Jerry. 2013. A comprehensive Manchu-English dictionary. Cambridge: Harvard University Asia Center.
Pakendorf, Brigitte. 2014. Paradigm copying in Tungusic: The Lamunkhin dialect of Ėven and beyond. In Martine Robbeets & Walter Bisang (eds), Paradigm Change: In the Transeurasian languages and beyond, 287-310. Amsterdam: Benjamins.
Pakendorf, Brigitte. 2015. A comparison of copied morphemes in Sakha (Yakut) and Ėven. In Francesco Gardani, Peter Arkadiev & Nino Amiridze (eds), Borrowed morphology, 157–187. Berlin: De Gruyter Mouton.
Pakendorf, Brigitte. 2017. Lamunkhin Even evaluative morphology in cross-linguistic comparison. Morphology 27. 123-158.
Pakendorf, Brigitte & Natalia Aralova, 2018. The endangered state of Negidal: A field report. Language Documentation and Conservation 12. 1-14.
Pakendorf, Brigitte & Ija V. Krivoshapkina. 2014. Ėven nominal evaluatives and the marking of definiteness. Linguistic Typology 18(2). 289-331.
Pakendorf, Brigitte & R. Kuz'mina. 2016. Evenskij jazyk. In V. Mixal'čenko (ed.), Jazyk i obščestvo. Enciklopedija, 583-587. Azbukovnik: Izdatel'skij Centr.
Pevnov, Alexander M. 2016. On the specific features of Orok as compared with the other Tungusic languages. Studia Orientalia 117. 47-63.
Pevnov, Alexander M. 2017. On the origin of Uilta (Orok) nōni 'he or she‘. Hoppō jibun kenkū  10. 71-77.
Robbeets, Martine. 2015. Diachrony of verb morphology. Japanese and the Transeurasian languages. Berlin: De Gruyter Mouton.
Robbeets, Martine & Remco Bouckaert. 2018. Bayesian phylolinguistics reveals the internal structure of the Transeurasian family. Journal of Language Evolution 2018. 145–162.
Róna-Tas, András 2016. Khitan studies I: The graphs of the Khitan small script. 1 General remarks, dotted graphs, numerals. Acta Orientalia Hungarica 69 (2): 117‒138.
Sebillaud, Pauline & Liu Xiaoxi. 2016. Une ville jurchen au temps des Ming (XIV e -XVII e siècle): Huifacheng, un carrefour économique et culturel. Arts Asiatiques 71. 55-76.
Shimunek, Andrew. 2016. Yöröö Khamnigan: A possibly recently extinct Tungusic language of northern Mongolia. Altai Hakpo 26. 13-28.
Shimunek, Andrew. 2017. Languages of ancient southern Mongolia and North China. Wiesbaden: Harrassowitz.
Shimunek, Andrew. 2018. Early Serbi-Mongolic–Tungusic Lexical Contact: Jurchen Numerals from the  Shirwi (Shih-wei) in North China. In Bela Kempf, Ákos Bertalan Apatóczky & Christopher P. Atwood (eds.), Philology of the Grasslands: Essays in Mongolic, Turkic, and Tungusic Studies, 331-346. Leiden: Brill.
Siska, Veronika et al. 2017. Genome-wide data from two early Neolithic East Asian individuals dating to 7700 years ago. Science Advances 3: e1601877.
Stary, Giovanni. 2015. Manchu-Chinese bilingual compositions and their verse-technique. Central Asiatic Journal 58(1-2). 1-5.
Stary, Giovanni. 2017. Neue Beiträge zum Sibe-Wortschatz. In Michał Németh, Barbara Podolak & Mateusz Urban (eds.), Essays in the history of languages and linguistics. Dedicated to Marek Stachowski on the occasion of his 60th birthday, 703-707. Cracow: Księgarnia Akademicka.
Sun Hao. 2014. A re-examination of the Jurchen Sanshi-bu (“thirty surnames”). Eurasian Studies 2. 84-121.
Tabarev, Andrei V. 2014. The later prehistory of the Russian Far East. In Colin Renfrew & Paul Bahn (eds.), The Cambridge world prehistory, 3 vols., 852-869. Cambridge: Cambridge University Press.
Tolskaya, Inna. 2014. Oroch vowel harmony. Lingua 138. 128-151.
Tolskaya, Maria. 2015. Udihe. In Nicola Grandi & Lívia Körtvélyessy (eds.), Edinburgh handbook of evaluative morphology, 333– 340. Edinburgh: Edinburgh University Press.
Trachsel, Yves. 2018. Archery in primers. Debtelin 2 109-115.
Tsumagari, Toshiro. 2014. Remarks on the Uilta folktale text collected by B. Pilsudski. Hoppō jinbun kenkyū  7. 83- 94.
Tulisow, Jerzy. 2015. The wedding song of Shamaness Nisin: An unknown fragment of a well-known tale. Central Asiatic Journal 58(1-2). 155-168.
Vovin, Alexander. 2012. Did Wanyan Xiyin invent the Jurchen script? In Andrej Malchukov & Lindsay J. Whaley (eds.), Recent advances in Tungusic linguistics, 49-58. Wiesbaden: Harrassowitz.
Vovin, Alexander. 2013. From Koguryŏ to T’amna. Slowly riding to the South with speakers of Proto-Korean. Korean Linguistics 15(2). 222–240.
Vovin, Alexander. 2015a. Eskimo loanwords in northern Tungusic. Iran and the Caucasus 19. 87-95.
Vovin, Alexander. 2015b. Some notes on the Tuyuhun language: In the footsteps of Paul Pelliot. Journal of Sino-Western Communications 7(2). 157‒166.
Vovin, Alexander. 2018. Four Tungusic etymologies. In Bela Kempf, Ákos Bertalan Apatóczky & Christopher P. Atwood (eds.), Philology of the Grasslands: Essays in Mongolic, Turkic, and Tungusic Studies, 366-368. Leiden: Brill.
Walravens, Hartmut. 2015. Christian literature in Manchu. Central Asiatic Journal 58(1-2). 197-224.
Walravens, Hartmut. 2017. A note on digitised Manchu texts. Central Asiatic Journal 60(1-2. 341-344.
Wang Qingfeng . 2005. Manyu yanjiu . Peking: Minzu chubanshe.
Weng Jianmin  & Chaoke  D. O. 2016. Aoluguya ewenke yu yanjiu . Peking: Shehui kexue wenxian chubanshe.
Yamada Yoshiko , . 2015. Uirutago kita hōgen tekisuto: Hito kui obake no hanashi    . Hoppō gengo kenkyū  5. 261-280.
Yamada Yoshiko , . 2016. Gishikutauda (marīya miheewa) no shōgai: Uiruta-go kita hōgen tekisuto   : . Hoppō gengo kenkyū  6. 179-201.
Yamada Yoshiko , . 2017. Uiruta-go kita hōgen no on'in-teki keitai-teki tokuchō: Minami hōgen to no sōi-ten o chūshin ni  : . Hoppō gengo kenkyū  10. 51-70.
Zgusta, Richard. 2015. The peoples of Northeast Asia through time. Precolonial ethnic and cultural processes along the coast between Hokkaido and the Bering Strait. Leiden: Brill.
Zhang Paiyu. 2013. The Kilen language of Manchuria. Grammar of a moribund Tungusic language. Hong Kong: Hongkong University Press. (Doctoral dissertation.)
Zhao Jie. 1989. Xiandai manyu yanjiu. Peking: Minzu chubanshe.
Zhu Zhenhua, Hongyan Zhang, Jianjun Zhao, Xiaoyi Guo, Zhengxiang Zhang, Yanling Ding & Tao Xiong. 2018. Using toponyms to analyze the endangered Manchu language in Northeast China. Sustainability 10(563). 1-17.
Zikmundová, Veronika. 2013. Spoken Sibe. Morphology of the inflected parts of speech. Prague: Karolinum. 37

External links
Monumenta Altaica—Altaic Linguistics. Grammars, Texts, Dictionaries, Bibliographies of Mongolian and other Altaic languages
Tungusic Research Group  at Dartmouth College
 Tungusic languages
 Vergleich der Reziproken des Ewenischen mit verwandten Sprachen
 http://www.siberianlanguages.surrey.ac.uk/summary/

 
Agglutinative languages
Language families